Terrence James Board (5 November 1945 – 23 November 2019) was an Australian rules footballer who played with Carlton in the Victorian Football League (VFL). 

His brother Jim Board played football for Collingwood and his son Terry Jr played for Fitzroy.

Notes

External links 

Terry Board's profile at Blueseum

1945 births
2019 deaths
Carlton Football Club players
South Warrnambool Football Club players
Australian rules footballers from Victoria (Australia)